= Nhồi Mountain =

Mountain in Vietnam

Coordinates: 19.79085°N 105.74940°E

Nhồi Mountain is located at Nhồi Village, it has other names such as An Hoach, Khe, or Nghe Son. Nowadays, it is located in An Hoạch ward, Thanh Hóa city, Thanh Hóa Province.

== Cultural significance ==
Nhoi mountain has been recognized as national monument and landscape by Ministry Of Culture, Sports and Tourism of Viet Nam. Nhoi mountain has 100 m of height and 4000 m of perimeter. From the far distance visitors can see it as symbol of giant lying elephant. Standing parallel with Long mountain, Nhoi and Long mountain form " Crouching Elephant Hidden Tiger " symbol that was considered as a lucky fang sui model in Eastern Philosophy. On top, it has a natural rocky pole that was approximately 20 m, and it looks like an upper part on man body. Behind that rocky pole there is another rocky shape that is looked like a woman is carrying a son, and facing to the East Sea. That rocky symbol is related to a Vietnamese folk story, it symbolizes for woman in the past who were waiting for their husbands to come back after war. It is quite similar to story of To Thi in another mountain of Lang Son Province

At the bottom of Nhoi Mountain, there are many temples such as Bao Lai that was built in 1100 with Ly Dynasty Architecture Style. Tien Son temple has a lot of rocky statutes that appear in various kind of shapes such as elephants, horses, dragons, unicorns, staffs and officer of ancient government. Tien Son temple has a lot of sculptures, those sculptures were directly carved on Nhoi mountain. These sculptures held very important cultural and historical value. In addition, scientists have been discovered many ancient tools such as bronze hammers, bronze knives, and ancient skeletons.
